José López Rubio y Herreros (13 December 1903 in Motril, Granada Province – 2 March 1996) was a Spanish playwright, screenwriter, film director, theatre historian and humorist.

Rubio y Herreros worked in Hollywood as a songwriter for Paramount Pictures, and was nominated for an Oscar for Treasure of the Sierra Madre. He was one of the biggest jewels of the Spanish art in the 20th century.

Selected filmography
Primavera en otoño (1933)
 El rey de los gitanos (1933)
The Prodigal Woman (1946)
 Airport (1953)
 Currito of the Cross (1965)
 Road to Rocío (1966)
 Two Men and Two Women Amongst Them (1977)

1903 births
1996 deaths
People from Motril
Spanish male dramatists and playwrights
Members of the Royal Spanish Academy
Spanish film directors
Spanish male screenwriters
Generation of '27
20th-century Spanish dramatists and playwrights
20th-century Spanish male writers
20th-century Spanish screenwriters